Ruth Finley (January 14, 1920 – August 25, 2018) was an American businesswoman who was the founder and publisher of The Fashion Calendar and a central figure in the American fashion industry.

Education 
Ruth Finley attended Simmons College in Boston between 1937 and 1941, where she majored in journalism and minored in nutrition.<ref name=. A summer internship at the New York Herald Tribune allowed her to meet the Tribune's fashion writer, Eugenia Sheppard, who then introduced Finley to Eleanor Lambert. Lambert became a mentor to Finley.

Finley worked as a theater usher in New York during college and after graduation. At the time, theater in New York followed a centralized schedule of dates and events.<ref name=  Responding to a lack of coordination in the growing American fashion industry, Finley along with Frances Hughes started the subscription-based Fashion Calendar in the early 1940s. In erstwhile print form, the Calendar was published every week, and listed all logistical and contact information for all fashion shows and related events in New York City and abroad.

In the past, the extent of listings and content changed over time, and would at various time list other events of cultural significance. Finley's personal approach to conducting her business earned her the reputation and respect as the planner of New York Fashion Week.

Today, the Fashion Calendar exists online, and is considered the main source for tracking runway shows and promotional events year-round and during New York Fashion Week. On October 1, 2014, the Calendar was acquired by the Council of Fashion Designers of America. A documentary about Ruth Finley and the Fashion Calendar, directed by Christian D. Bruun, is scheduled for an upcoming release.

Finley was an active board member of Citymeals on Wheels.

Honors
2016: The Fashion Institute of Technology President's Lifetime Achievement Award 

2014: The CFDA Board of Directors Tribute Award 

2010: The National Arts Club Medal of Honor.

2008: The High School of Fashion Industries Lifetime Achievement Award

References

External links
The CFDA Acquires Ruth Finley’s Fashion Calendar
WWD: The Ultimate ‘Calendar Girl’ Ruth Finley Spotlighted in Upcoming Documentary

1920 births
2018 deaths
Simmons University alumni
American fashion businesspeople